The 2014 Red Bull Air Race of Rovinj was the second round of the 2014 Red Bull Air Race World Championship, the ninth season of the Red Bull Air Race World Championship. The event was held in Rovinj, on the Adriatic coast of Croatia.

Master Class

Qualification

Round of 12

 Pilot received 1 second in penalties.

Super 8

Final 4

Challenger Class

Results

Standings after the event

Master Class standings

Challenger Class standings

 Note: Only the top five positions are included for both sets of standings.

References

External links

|- style="text-align:center"
|width="35%"|Previous race:2014 Red Bull Air Race of Abu Dhabi
|width="30%"|Red Bull Air Race2014 season
|width="35%"|Next race:2014 Red Bull Air Race of Putrajaya
|- style="text-align:center"
|width="35%"|Previous race:None
|width="30%"|Red Bull Air Race of Rovinj
|width="35%"|Next race:2015 Red Bull Air Race of Rovinj
|- style="text-align:center"

2014 in Croatian sport
Rovinj
Sport in Istria County